The buildings of the Silver Creek Ranger Station typify Civilian Conservation Corps (CCC) and Economic Recovery Act (ERA). These relief programs employed local youth and experienced craftsmen. Building materials and camp supplies were obtained locally. The U.S. Forest Service's was the host agency and the facility was the headquarters for field operation The design of the buildings is an example of the rustic architectural style used by the Forest Service. Building 1362 (originally the office, converted to a bunkhouse) is rare. Only three log Depression-era offices are known in the Pacific Northwest Region.

Description
The Silver Creek Ranger Station is located in a forest of Douglas-fir and Pacific silver fir. It is along Washington State Route 410 and the White River, and short distance north of the Northeast Entrance to Mount Rainier National Park. The historic site includes an office, a residence, a garage, a warehouse, and an equipment storage building.  All were built the Great Depression. There are five additional buildings and structures which are not of historic interest.
The Ranger Station was established after World War I, when a road was constructed to the area.  The roadway became a popular Sunday trip from Seattle, Tacoma.  It provided access to both a nearby towns to Silver Creek and to White River Camp in Mt. Rainier National Park. The Ranger Station was located to provided services to growing recreational use. It was used during the summer season.
The first buildings were a three-sided woodshed/garage, and a frame structure.  The frame structure contained a one-room office, a tool and warehouse room, a kitchen, and sleeping quarters plus an unfinished second floor. This building burned in 1930, and a new office was built the following year. That building is the front part of Building 1362. In 1941, winter operations were transferred from Tacoma to Enumclaw followed in 1943 by the move of the summer operations. The Silver Creek facility was turned into a work center.

Reference

Bibliography
McCullough, R. Nevan, 1970 Interpretive study of the White River drainage. Photocopy of typescript, on file, USDA Forest Service, Mt. Baker-Snoqualmie National Forest, Cultural Resource staff, Seattle.
Throop, E. Gail, 1984 USDA Forest Service administrative buildings in the State [sic] of Oregon and Washington built by the Civilian Conservation Corps. USDA Forest Service, Pacific Northwest Region, Portland.

		
National Register of Historic Places in Pierce County, Washington
Buildings and structures completed in 1936